Wind Energy is a monthly peer-reviewed scientific journal covering research on wind power published by John Wiley & Sons. The editor-in-chief is Simon Watson (Delft University of Technology). According to the Journal Citation Reports, the journal has a 2020 impact factor of 2.730, ranking it 78th out of 114 journals in "Energy & Fuels" and 54th out of 135 journals in "Engineering Mechanical".

References

External links 
 
 Print: 
 Online: 

Wiley (publisher) academic journals
Publications established in 1998
English-language journals
Energy and fuel journals
Monthly journals
Wind power